Indeleble is the eleventh studio album released by Mexican singer Alejandra Guzmán. The album was produced by Loris Ceroni and features songs written by Mario Domm, lead singer of the Mexican group Camila and Kalimba.

It is one of the best-reviewed albums on Guzman's career and also is the responsible for bringing her back to the top of the charts in Mexico. The album won the Best Album prize at the Oye Awards in Mexico. Also received two nominations for the Latin Grammy Awards of 2006 for Best Rock Solo Performance and Best Rock Song for the first single "Volverte a Amar", losing both to Gustavo Cerati.

The album yielded a second single, "Quiero Estar Contigo" and the track "Necesito Amarme" was featured on the Mexican film Así del Precipicio.

It reached platinum status in Mexico peaking at #1 in the charts. Also peaked at #21 on the Billboard's Top Latin Albums chart and #22 on the Heatseekers survey.

Track listing
 "Quiero Estar Contigo" (Ettorce Grenci, Alejandra Guzmán, Mario Domm) — 03:38
 "Déjalo" (Erik Buffat, Oscar Schiebell, Loris Ceroni) — 04:27	
 "No Estoy Llorando" (Ettore Grenci, Kalimba) — 03:03	
 "Al Final De Cuentas" (Amerika, Luis Fernando Ochoa, Tommy Torres) — 03:34	
 "Volverte a Amar" (Alejandra Guzmán, Mario Domm) — 03:41	
 "Mujer" (Alejandra Guzmán, Jodi Marr, George Noriega) — 03:42	
 "Necesito Amarme" (Alejandra Guzmán, Mario Domm) — 03:05	
 "Tirando Piedras" (Alejandra Guzmán, Cesar Valle, Jodi Marr) — 03:57	
 "Marta" (Paty Cantz, Cesar Valle) — 03:21	
 "Bye Bye" (Claudia Brant) — 03:52
 "Siénteme A Tú Lado" (Alejandra Guzmán, Rot Iavari, Luis Liranzo, Jodi Marr) — 04:09

Singles

Charts

Sales and certifications

References

2006 albums
Alejandra Guzmán albums